is a Japanese voice actor. He is attached to Across Entertainment.

Filmography

Films
Wonderful World (2010) – Jiro Kumada

Television dramas
Dragon Zakura (2005) – Scout

Television animation
Turn A Gundam (1999) – Phil Ackman
Detective Conan (2000) – Yota Mitani
Hunter × Hunter (2001) – Izunabi (episode 56)
Cosmo Warrior Zero (2001) – Rubia
Beck (2005) – Marquee manager
Mushishi (2005) – Jin
Eyeshield 21 (2005) – Rikiya Gao
Trinity Blood (2005) – Leon Garcia de Asturias
Utawarerumono (2006) – Kurou
Busou Renkin* (2006) – Genji Ikusabe
The Wallflower (2006) – Hiromi Hanayashiki
Michiko to Hatchin (2008) – Tony
Saki (2009) – Daisuke Yamaguchi
Katanagatari (2010) – Kanara Azekura
Horizon in the Middle of Nowhere (2011) – Galileo
Jormungand (2012) – Shishō
Sword Art Online (2012) – PoH
Beast Saga (2013) – Killer Shark
Akame ga Kill! (2014) – Orga
Saki: The Nationals (2014) – Daisuke Yamaguchi
One Piece (2014) – Hajrudin
Hanayamata (2014) – Masaru Ōfuna
Gundam Reconguista in G (2014) – Dellensen Samatar
Gangsta. (2015) – Miles Meyer
Undefeated Bahamut Chronicle (2016) – Bagriser Gasthof
Digimon Universe: Appli Monsters (2016) – Coachmon
Zero kara Hajimeru Mahō no Sho (2017) – Beast Mercenary
Dragon Ball Super (2017) – Basil
One Piece (2017) – Charlotte Counter, Raideen
Altair: A Record of Battles (2017) – Derecho and Esquerdo
Tada Never Falls in Love (2018) – Tokugawa Nijimune/Reinbō Shōgun (episode 1–3), Juusan (episode 1, 3)
Hinamatsuri (2018) – Kiyoshi Baba
Zombie Land Saga (2018) – Takeo Gō
If It's for My Daughter, I'd Even Defeat a Demon Lord (2019) – Kenneth
Ascendance of a Bookworm (2019–2022) – Gunther
One Piece (2019) – Holdem
Boruto: Naruto Next Generations (2020) – Doragu
Yashahime: Princess Half-Demon (2020–present) – Jyūbei
Sakugan (2021) – Boss
Restaurant to Another World 2 (2021) – Souemon
Utawarerumono: Mask of Truth (2022) – Kurou
Akiba Maid War (2022) – General

ONA
JoJo's Bizarre Adventure: Stone Ocean (2021–2022) – Sports Maxx

OVA
Legend of the Galactic Heroes (1999) – Goodwin
Hunter × Hunter: Greed Island (2003) – Genthru
Hunter × Hunter: G.I. Final (2004) – Genthru
Nijiiro Prism Girl (2013) – Director

Theatrical animation
Princess Arete (2001) – Boax
Mai Mai Miracle (2009) – Tatara
Cyborg 009 Vs. Devilman (2015) – Geronimo Jr./005
In This Corner of the World (2016) – Jūrō
One Piece: Stampede (2019) – Bastille

Video games
Ni no Kuni series (2010–2012) – Heburuchi
BlazBlue series – Bang Shishigami
 Super Smash Bros. for Nintendo 3DS and Wii U and Super Smash Bros. Ultimate - Doc Louis
Xenoblade Chronicles (2010) – Dickson
Atelier Escha & Logy: Alchemists of the Dusk Sky (2013) – Duke Beriel
Muramasa: The Demon Blade (2013) – Shinzaemon Shigematsu
ZombiU (Japanese dub)
Kamen Rider: Climax Series (2010 - 2012), All Kamen Rider: Rider Generation Series (2012 - 2016), Kamen Rider: Battride War Series (2013 - 2016) - Kamen Rider Summonride (2014), Kamen Rider Storm Heroes (2015), Kamen Rider Transcend Heroes (2016) – Kamen Rider Odin
Dragalia Lost (2021) – Shingen
Cyberpunk 2077 (2020) – Takemura
Monster Hunter Rise: Sunbreak (2022) – Admiral Galeus
Last Cloudia (2022) - VayneOctopath Traveler II (2023) – General MugenSword Art Online: Last Recollection (2023) – Vassago

TokusatsuKamen Rider Ryuki (2002) – Visor Voice (main ep), Kamen Rider Odin (eps. 27 - 50)Kamen Rider 555: Paradise Lost (2003) – Lion OrphnochKamen Rider Den-O (2007) – Rhino Imajin (eps. 9 & 10)Kamen Rider Ex-Aid (2017) – Burgermon Bugster (ep. 17)

Dubbing
Live-actionBrawl in Cell Block 99 – Bradley Thomas (Vince Vaughn)FBI – Jubal Valentine (Jeremy Sisto)Kamen Rider: Dragon Knight – Eubulon (Mark Dacascos)A Lonely Place to Die – Andy (Eamonn Walker)The Jungle Book (2016) – Shere Khan (Idris Elba)

AnimationRatchet & Clank'' – Lieutenant Victor Von Ion

References

External links
Tsuyoshi Koyama at Across Entertainment 
Tsuyoshi Koyama official blog 

1967 births
Japanese male video game actors
Japanese male voice actors
Living people
Male voice actors from Aichi Prefecture
Waseda University alumni
Across Entertainment voice actors
20th-century Japanese male actors
21st-century Japanese male actors